Cromwell is a play by Victor Hugo, written in 1827. It was influenced by Hugo's literary circle, which identified itself as Romanticist and chose as a model dramatist Shakespeare instead of the Classicists Jean Racine and Pierre Corneille (who were supported by the French Academy).

Due to its length of 6920 verses as well as the logistical problems of recreating Hugo's absurdly large cast of characters, the play remained unperformed until 1956. It tells the story of Oliver Cromwell's internal conflicts in being offered the crown of England. It is notable for its preface, now considered the manifesto of the Romantic movement.

References

External links

1827 plays
Plays by Victor Hugo
Plays about the English Civil War
Cultural depictions of Oliver Cromwell